The Tagish Road (also known as Yukon Highway 8) is a  road, now hard surfaced, that links Jakes Corner on the Alaska Highway with Carcross, Yukon on the Klondike Highway.  from Jakes Corner is the terminus of the Atlin Road.

Until the Alaska Highway was completed in 1943 along Marsh Lake, the Tagish Road was a vital segment of the original Alaska Highway route opened in the fall of 1942. For many years, a long wooden bridge was a vital link over the Tagish River, but a concrete bridge replaced it. Rerouting and realignment of the first  was completed in June, 2005.

See also 
 List of Yukon territorial highways

Yukon territorial highways